The Orsten fauna are fossilized organisms preserved in the Orsten lagerstätten of Cambrian (Late Miaolingian to Furongian) rocks, notably at Kinnekulle and on the island of Öland, all in Sweden.

The initial site, discovered in 1975 by Klaus Müller and his assistants, exceptionally preserves soft-bodied organisms, and their larvae, who are preserved uncompacted in three dimensions.  The fossils are phosphatized and silicified, thus the delicate chitinous cuticle and soft parts are not affected by acids, which act upon the limestone nodules within which the fossils have survived. Acids dissolve the limestone, revealing the microfossils in a recovery process called "acid etching". To recover the fossils, more than one and a half tons of Orsten limestone have been dissolved in acid, originally in a specifically designed laboratory in Bonn, more recently moved to Ulm. The insoluble residue is scanned by electron microscope. The phosphorus used to replace the fossils with calcium phosphate is presumed to be derived from fecal pellets.

The Orsten fauna has improved our understanding of metazoan phylogeny and evolution, particularly among the arthropods, thanks in part to unique preservation of larval stages.  The Orsten sites reveals the oldest well-documented benthic meiofauna in the fossil record. For the first time, fossils have been found of tardigrades ("water bears") and apparently free-living pentastomids.

The Cambrian strata consist of alum shales with limestone nodules (the Alum Shale Formation), which are interpreted as the products of an oxygen-depleted ("dysoxic") marine bottom water habitat of a possibly offshore seashelf at depths of perhaps 50–100 m. The bottom was rich in organic detritus, forming a soft muddy zone with floc in its surface layer.

Other Orsten-type preservation fauna have been found in Nevada, eastern Canada, England, Poland, Siberia, China and the Northern Territory of Australia.

Paleobiota 
Based on data from C.O.R.E website.

Orsten-type fauna found elsewhere

Notes

References
(Bristol University) Lagerstätten catalog: Orsten
C.O.R.E. Örsten site

Paleontological sites of Europe
Cambrian paleontological sites
Cambrian animals